Skywriter is the seventh studio album by The Jackson 5, released by Motown on March 29, 1973.

Background
Lead singer Michael's vocals were now showing the signs of his maturing tenor voice, while Jermaine's voice had become deeper in tone. Notably, one of Skywriter's songs, "Touch" (originally recorded by the Supremes in 1971), features Michael and Jermaine singing about satisfying a woman in bed. Due to the fact that Michael was only 14 years old at the time, "Touch" was one of the most controversial singles Michael had sung on until his solo career took off again in the late 1970s.

The group was also growing frustrated with the direction they were going in and complained to Motown's staff producers and writers about the kind of music they were doing. The brothers were openly discouraged by the style of music they had been receiving from Motown's writers. Also, by this point, all five brothers were writing their own material, but Motown prevented them from recording their own compositions. The frustration was showcased most openly by the album cover, where all five brothers solemnly look at the camera around an early 1900s era airplane. It was the band's least successful album to date because of only one Top 20 single. It was arranged by James Anthony Carmichael, Jerry Marcellino, Mel Larson, Freddie Perren, Gene Page, Fonce Mizell and the Corporation.

"The Boogie Man"/Don't Let Your Baby Catch You was prepared for release as a single, but was cancelled.

Track listing
Side one
"Skywriter" (Mel Larson, Jerry Marcellino) – 3:08
"Hallelujah Day" (Freddie Perren, Christine Yarian) – 2:46
"The Boogie Man" (Deke Richards) – 2:56
"Touch" (originally performed by the Supremes) (Pam Sawyer, Frank Wilson) – 3:00
"Corner of the Sky" (from the Broadway musical Pippin) (recorded 1972) (Stephen Schwartz) – 3:33

Side two
"I Can't Quit Your Love" (originally performed by the Four Tops) (Leonard Caston, Kathy Wakefield) – 3:12
"Uppermost" (Clifton Davis)  – 2:26
"World of Sunshine" (Mel Larson, Jerry Marcellino) – 2:45
"Ooh, I'd Love to Be with You" (Fonce Mizell, Larry Mizell) – 2:49
"You Made Me What I Am" (The Corporation) – 2:50

Re-release
In 2001, Motown Records remastered all Jackson 5 albums in a "Two Classic Albums/One CD" series (much like they did in the late 1980s). This album was paired up with Get It Together. The bonus tracks were the outtakes "Pride and Joy", "Love's Gone Bad" and "Love Is the Thing You Need". Each of these tracks also appear on the compilation album Joyful Jukebox Music/Boogie.

Charts

Notes

External links
 Skywriter Overview at www.jackson5abc.com 

1973 albums
The Jackson 5 albums
Motown albums
Albums arranged by Gene Page
Albums produced by Hal Davis
Albums produced by the Mizell Brothers
Albums produced by the Corporation (record production team)